Petrov is a municipality and village in Prague-West District in the Central Bohemian Region of the Czech Republic. It has about 800 inhabitants.

Administrative parts
Villages of Bohuliby and Chlomek are administrative parts of Petrov.

Geography
It lies in the Benešov Uplands on the right bank of the Sázava river.

History
The first written mention of Petrov is from 1310.

Notable people
Edward Kelley (1555–1597), English alchemist and occultist, bought Petrov in 1590

References

Villages in Prague-West District